Andrzej Tadeusz Strzelecki (4 February 1952 – 17 July 2020), was a Polish actor, satirist, theatre director, screenplay writer and rector of the Aleksander Zelwerowicz National Academy of Dramatic Art in Warsaw in the years 2008–2016.

In 1974 he graduated from the Acting Department of the National Academy of Dramatic Art in Warsaw, and in 1978 from the Directing Department. He played on stage in the Variety Theatre (1974–1981) and the Rampa Theatre (1987–1997) in Warsaw. As a TV announcer, he has hosted a number of programs for Telewizja Polska. Andrzej Strzelecki was awarded many times for his film and theatrical roles as well as for directorial work. As an actor, he also played in television series. In 2004 he was awarded the title of Professor of Theater Arts. Strzelecki was passionate about golf. He died of lung and bronchial cancer.

Selected filmography
 1967: Kiedy miłość była zbrodnią as Boy from Hitlerjugend
 1976: Excuse Me, Is It Here They Beat Up People? as Show Host
 1999–2020: Klan (TV series) as Tadeusz Koziełło
 2001: In Desert and Wilderness as Mr. Georg Rawlison
 2008: Rozmowy nocą
 2011: Battle of Warsaw 1920 as Wincenty Witos
 2017: Barwy szczęścia as Czarnoleski
 2019: Pół wieku poezji później as Wloscibyt, Head of a Village

References

External links 
 
 Andrzej Strzelecki's profile at filmpolski.pl
 Andrzej Strzelecki's profile at e-teatr.pl
 Andrzej Strzelecki at filmweb.pl

1952 births
2020 deaths
Aleksander Zelwerowicz National Academy of Dramatic Art in Warsaw alumni
Male actors from Warsaw
Polish cabaret performers
Polish film directors
Polish male film actors
Polish male stage actors
Polish male television actors
Polish satirists
Polish television presenters
Polish theatre directors
Recipients of the Gold Cross of Merit (Poland)
Rectors of universities in Poland
20th-century Polish male actors
21st-century Polish male actors